Shelton Erskine "Buck" Bounds (June 11, 1929 – January 31, 2020) was an American farmer and politician. A member of the Democratic Party, he served two terms on the Philadelphia, Mississippi board of aldermen and one term in the Mississippi House of Representatives. He ran for state senate in 1999 but lost to state Democratic chair Gloria Williamson in the primary. His son, C. Scott Bounds, currently serves in the legislature as a Republican, after he switched parties in 2010.

References

Democratic Party members of the Mississippi House of Representatives
1929 births
2020 deaths
20th-century American politicians